The 2013–14 AS Saint-Étienne season was the 81st professional season of the club since its creation in 1933.

Players

First-team squad 
As of 8 January 2013

Out on loan

Reserves 
As of 2 August 2012

Competitions

Overview

Ligue 1

League table

Results summary

Results by round

Matches

Coupe de France

Coupe de la Ligue

References

AS Saint-Étienne seasons
Saint-Etienne